Gyronotus is a genus of scarab beetles.

Species 
Species accepted within the Gyronotus include:

 Gyronotus carinatus
 Gyronotus dispar
 Gyronotus fimetarius
 Gyronotus glabrosus
 Gyronotus mulanjensis
 Gyronotus perissinottoi
 Gyronotus pumilus
 Gyronotus schuelei

References

Scarabaeidae
Beetles of Africa
Beetles described in 1874